Theodore Braun is an American film director and screenwriter best known for his Image Award-winning documentary film Darfur Now.  He is also an associate professor in the University of Southern California's School of Cinematic Arts' Writing Division.

Selected filmography as director
 Darfur Now (2007)
 Betting on Zero (2016)
 ¡Viva Maestro! (2022)

References

External links
 

American film directors
Living people
University of Southern California people
Year of birth missing (living people)
Place of birth missing (living people)